Grierson Spring is a historic spring located in Texas between the Concho and Pecos Rivers. It formed the head of a watershed from Llano Estacado. It was named after Benjamin Grierson, whose troops helped build an outpost on it and a road through it in 1878. This allowed for him to have control over the water supply in an attempt to control the region.

References

Bodies of water of Reagan County, Texas
Springs of Texas